The Battle of Dobra took place on February 24, 1863 near the village of Dobra, Russian-controlled Congress Poland. It was one of many skirmishes of the January Uprising, the anti-Russian rebellion of Poles.

On February 22, 1863, an insurgent unit of Józef Sawicki and dr. Józef Dworaczek, arrived at the town of Zgierz. The unit had some 300 men, including 60 riflemen, 210 kosynierzy, and 30 cavalry. With food supplies received in Zgierz, the insurgents marched to the forest near the village of Dobra, where they camped. The Poles were immediately followed by a group of the Imperial Russian Army, which consisted on infantry and Cossacks.

On February 24 the Russians reached the camp and decided to attack. Polish insurgents fought desperately, but facing supreme firepower of Russian soldiers, they eventually retreated. Altogether, some 60 Poles were killed in the battle. Among the fallen Poles, was female insurgent Maria Piotrowiczowa.

Sources 
 Stefan Kieniewicz: Powstanie styczniowe. Warszawa: Państwowe Wydawnictwo Naukowe, 1983. .

Dobra 1863
1863 in Poland
Dobra
February 1863 events